The Mayor of the Narayanganj City is the chief executive of the Barishal City Corporation. The Mayor's office administers all city services, public property, most public agencies, and enforces all city and state laws within Barisal city.

The Mayor's office is located in Nagar Bhaban; it has jurisdiction over all 30 wards of Barisal City

List of officeholders
Political parties

Status

Elections

Election result 2018

Election result 2013

References

Barisal
Barisal
Barisal